"Summer" is a song by Scottish DJ Calvin Harris, released on 14 March 2014 as the second single from his fourth studio album, Motion (2014). Like his earlier single "Feel So Close" and his later single "My Way", Harris returns as a vocalist on "Summer". The accompanying music video was directed by Emil Nava and premiered on 6 April 2014.

The song debuted at number one on the UK Singles Chart, becoming Harris's sixth UK number-one single. It peaked at number seven on the Billboard Hot 100, becoming his second top ten hit as a lead artist and third overall, and had sold over a million copies in the United States within 4 months of its release. "Summer" has received nominations for British Single and British Artist Video of the Year at the 2015 Brit Awards.

Background
On 11 March 2014, Harris posted fifteen-second clips of the song on Instagram up until 14 March, when it was released digitally in certain territories and made its radio debut on Capital FM.

"Summer" is composed in the key of G major and has a tempo of 128 beats per minute. It follows the chord progression C–Em–D–Am–G/B–C. Harris's vocal range spans from G2 to D4.

Critical reception
The song received generally positive reviews. Lewis Corner of Digital Spy rated "Summer" three-and-a-half out of five stars, calling it "a bright and vibrant banger destined to soundtrack the warmer months". Jamieson Cox of Time magazine felt that the song "doesn't have much lyrical meat on its bones, but coming on the heels of one of the most severe winters in recent memory, listeners are likely hungry for anything that suggests a warmer, sunnier season. One of Harris' trademark gigantic synth hooks doesn't hurt its digestibility, either." Robbie Daw of Idolator viewed the track as "a shameless bid at nabbing an 'Umbrella'/'California Gurls'/'Blurred Lines'-like Song Of The Summer anthem".

In September 2014, "Summer" was named the song of the summer by Spotify; it was the most listened track since June 2014 with more than 160 million plays. Time listed "Summer" as the fourth worst song of 2014.

In 2022, the song received a resurgence in popularity due to an Internet meme from the previous year about the misheard lyrics, replacing "When I met you in the summer" with "Wenomechainsama" usually in a speech bubble next to an animal or character.

Music video
The music video for "Summer" was directed by Emil Nava and premiered on 6 April 2014, with a cameo appearance by English actor Jason Statham.

As of June 2022, the music video has received over 1.5 billion views on YouTube.

Track listings

Charts

Weekly charts

Year-end charts

Decade-end charts

Certifications

Release history

References

External links
 

2014 singles
2014 songs
Calvin Harris songs
Columbia Records singles
Dutch Top 40 number-one singles
Irish Singles Chart number-one singles
Number-one singles in Finland
Number-one singles in Russia
Number-one singles in Scotland
Songs written by Calvin Harris
UK Singles Chart number-one singles
Electronic dance music songs